Live at Arena Zagreb is a live concert video from the Croatian cello duo, 2Cellos, filmed at Croatia's Arena Zagreb, in 2012. It was released on 21 August 2013 to DVD.

The concert is notable for being their "homecoming" show and their biggest solo concert at that point, with over 20,000 fans attending.

2Cellos were accompanied by the Zagreb Philharmonic Orchestra while they performed classical repertoire. The concert also included songs from their self-titled debut album and their second album, In2ition.

Setlist 

Benedictus 
Élégie in C Minor, Op. 24 
Gabriel's Oboe 
Oblivion 
Welcome to the Jungle 
Purple Haze 
Resistance 
Californication 
With Or Without You 
Where The Streets Have No Name 
Viva La Vida 
Human Nature 
Smooth Criminal 
You Shook Me All Night Long 
Highway to Hell 
Back In Black 
When I Come Around 
Smells Like Teen Spirit 
Fields of Gold 
Hurt 
End Credits
Behind the Scenes

Personnel
2Cellos
 Luka Šulić – cello
 Stjepan Hauser – cello

Additional personnel
 Ivo Lipanović – conductor
 Zagreb Philharmonic Orchestra
 Dušan Kranjc – drums

References

External links 
 Live at Arena Zagreb at Amazon
 Live at Arena Zagreb at CD Universe

2Cellos albums
2013 video albums
2013 live albums
Live video albums